Norman Raymond Riddell (26 March 1918 – 10 November 2013) was an Australian rules footballer who played with Collingwood in the Victorian Football League (VFL) during the 1940s.

Riddell's VFL career was limited due to the war, as he was at the time a Leading Aircraftman with the RAAF. He played twice in the 1944 VFL season and his only appearance in 1945 was a preliminary final, which Collingwood lost. Riddell played in two further games in 1946. He briefly coached Preston in 1951, as a replacement for Reg Ryan who left before the season concluded.

References

1918 births
2013 deaths
Australian rules footballers from Melbourne
Collingwood Football Club players
Northcote Football Club players
Preston Football Club (VFA) coaches
People from Thornbury, Victoria
Royal Australian Air Force personnel of World War II
Military personnel from Melbourne